Chandler Park Academy is a K-12 college preparatory elementary, middle, and charter high school in Harper Woods, Michigan, United States that was established in 1997.

The student body is 98.89% African American and 80% of students qualify for free/reduced price lunch. The student/teacher ratio is 25:1.

Chandler Park Academy rates lower than most nearby public schools based on test scores according to greatschools.net, although their fall 2006 MEAP and National Merit scores were higher than the State of Michigan targets

Notable alumni 
Derrick Walton, professional basketball player

See also 

 List of public school academy districts in Michigan

References 

Schools in Wayne County, Michigan
Charter schools in Michigan
Public high schools in Michigan
Public middle schools in Michigan
Public elementary schools in Michigan
1997 establishments in Michigan
Educational institutions established in 1997